The Downtown Commercial District in Lexington, Kentucky, includes 70 contributing properties, some dating from the early 19th century. Most sites are commercial buildings, but the district also features a courthouse, two monuments, a camel sculpture, a drinking fountain, and a clock. Various architectural styles are represented, including Federal, Greek Revival, Italianate, Victorian, Queen Anne, Richardsonian Romanesque, Beaux Arts, and Modern. Architects include Gideon Shryock, Benjamin Henry Latrobe, H.L. Rowe, Frankel & Curtis, and McKim, Mead & White. Also included within the district are 17 noncontributing properties. The Downtown Commercial District was added to the National Register of Historic Places in 1983.

Lexington's street grid was platted beginning in 1780, and the Downtown Commercial District is contained within the oldest part of the city. The district is roughly bounded by Church St, N Limestone St, E Short St, E Main St, W Main St, and N Mill St.

Contributing properties
Some buildings in the district were constructed after fires in 1875 and in 1917 destroyed previous buildings, and other historic buildings were destroyed by urban renewal. This list of contributing properties includes the street group and where available the name, year, address, architect, and style of each building.

Cheapside
 Fayette Safety Vault and Trust Company Building (1890) NRHP, 111-113 Cheapside, H.L. Rowe, Victorian
 Robert S. Todd Store Building (c1807), 115-117 Cheapside, Federal
 Second National Bank Building (1955), 119-121 Cheapside, Nicholas Warfield Gratz, Neoclassical
 Payne Building (1891), 125-127 Cheapside, Victorian
 Loughridge Building (1895), 129-131 Cheapside, H.L. Rowe, Richardsonian Romanesque

Church Street
 Building (1935), 108-114 Church St

North Limestone Street
 Thomas Lyons Building (c1875), 109-113 N Limestone St, Italianate
 Lyons Block (c1875), 106-108 N Limestone St, Italianate
 Lyons Block (c1875), 110-112 N Limestone St, Italianate
 James McCormick Building (c1875), 122 N Limestone St, Italianate
 Harold Fine Building (1920), 124-128 N Limestone St, Arts and Crafts movement
 David Clohesey Building (c1875), 130-132 N Limestone St, Italianate
 Gratz Real Estate Building (1920), 131-137 N Limestone St, possibly Nicholas Warfield Gratz, Colonial Revival
 Charles Berryman Building (c1915), 134-136 N Limestone St, Colonial Revival
 Piggly Wiggly Store (c1920), 139-143 N Limestone St
 Building (c1920), 147 N Limestone St
 Feeney's Shoe Store Building (c1920), 149-153 N Limestone St
 Hotel (c1928), 155 N Limestone St
 Hotel (1928), 159 N Limestone St, Arts and Crafts

East Main Street
 Waters Block, AKA Lyons Block (c1875), 101-109 E Main St, Italianate
 Hallmark House (c1923), 111 E Main St, Frankel & Curtis
 Benton Ross Todd Company Building, AKA Charles Berryman Building (1920), 113-117 E Main St, possibly Frank L. Smith, Beaux Arts
 Nunan Building (1912, possibly 1860s), 123-125 E Main St, Neoclassical
 Carty Block (c1871), 129-131 E Main St, Italianate
 Byrnes & Hall Drug Store (c1920), 133 E Main St
 Lexington Steam Laundry Company (c1890), 135 E Main St
 Old Bank of Commerce Building (c1918), 137 E Main St, possibly Frankel & Curtis, Neoclassical
 Lexington Laundry Company (c1929), 139 E Main St, Art Deco
 Graham Building (1902), 141-143 E Main St, possibly H.L. Rowe, Neoclassical

West Main Street
 John B. Johnson's Saddlery (1830s), 101-103 W Main St, Federal
 Odd Fellows Temple (1869) NRHP, 115-119 W Main St, Cincinnatus Shryock, Italianate
 Skuller's Clock (c1910), 119 W Main St, Brown Street Clocks, Neoclassical
 Randall Building Bogaert's Jewelry Store (1870s) NRHP, 127-129 W Main St, possibly Phelix L. Lundin, Italianate
 Higgins Block (c1872) NRHP, 145-151 W Main St, John McMurtry, Italianate
 Fayette National Bank Building (1913) NRHP, 159-167 W Main St, McKim, Mead & White, Beaux Arts
 McAdams and Morford Building (1849) NRHP, 200-210 W Main St, Italianate
 Fayette County Courthouse (1900), 215 W Main St, Lehman & Schmitt, Richardsonian Romanesque
 John Hunt Morgan Memorial (1910) NRHP, Corner W Main & N Upper Sts, Pompeo Coppini
 Ellis Fountain (1921), 215 W Main St
 Union Station Camel (c1920), Corner W Main St & Cheapside
 John C. Breckinridge Memorial (1887) NRHP, Cheapside between W Short & W Main Sts, Edward Virginius Valentine
 Lexington City National Bank Building (1904) NRHP, 259-265 W Main St, Richards, McCarty & Bulford, Beaux Arts
 Benjamin Winslow Dudley Hospital (c1834), 301-305 W Main St, Federal
 Wilgus Block (c1805 or c1872), 309-315 W Main St, Italianate

North Mill Street
 James Dunn House (1807), 108-110 N Mill St, Federal
 Richardson Building (1900), 109 N Mill St, Neoclassical
 Robert Peter Building (1890), 115-117 N Mill St, Italianate
 Geary & Roche Plumbing Company Building (1871), 119 N Mill St, Italianate
 Margaret Price Building (1915), 121 N Mill St
 Monsieur Giron's Confectionary (1829) NRHP, 125 N Mill St, Greek Revival

West Short Street
 Alexander Hotel (c1875), 102-110 W Short St, Italianate
 Merrick Lodge #31 (c1893), 101-105 W Short St, H.L. Rowe, Neoclassical
 Morton Realty Company Building (1928), 107 Short St
 Still Building (1925), 129-131 W Short St
 Remington Rand Building (1928), 133 W Short St, Tudor Revival
 Messick Building (1928), 155-157 W Short St, possibly Frankel & Curtis, Neoclassical
 McClelland Building (1901), 159-167 W Short St, Richards, McCarty & Bulford; Arthur Giannini, Beaux Arts
 Guarantee Bank & Trust Company Building (1924), 201-211 W Short St, Art Deco
 Old First National Bank Building (1895), 215-219 W Short St, possibly H.L. Rowe, Beaux Arts
 Northern Bank Building (1890), 249-257 W Short St, H.L. Rowe, Victorian
 Northern Bank Building (1890), 259-267 W Short St, H.L. Rowe, Victorian
 Security Trust Building (1905), 267-275 W Short St, Richards, McCarty & Bulford, Beaux Arts
 Harting Block (1905), 300 W Short St, H.L. Rowe, Neoclassical
 Old U.S. Post Office (c1825), 315 Short St, Federal
 Lewis Ramsey Meat Market (1870s), 310-312 W Short St, Italianate
 Hotel Reed Annex (c1901), 313-315 W Short St, Martin Geertz, Queen Anne
 Campbell Building (c1886), 316-318 W Short St, probably H.L. Rowe, Greek Revival

North Upper Street
 Chinn & Todd Building (1896), 108 N Upper St, possibly Aldenburg & Scott
 Clay-Worsley Building (c1805), 110-112 N Upper St, Federal
 Berkley, Guthrie & Watson Building (1885), 114-116 N Upper St, H.L. Rowe, Victorian
 Berkley, Guthrie & Watson Addition (c1891), 118-120 N Upper St, possibly H.L. Rowe, Victorian
 Walter Warfield Building (1806), 122-124 N Upper St, possibly Mathias Shryock, Georgian

References

External links

National Register of Historic Places in Lexington, Kentucky
Historic districts on the National Register of Historic Places in Kentucky
Commercial buildings on the National Register of Historic Places in Kentucky